La5 is an Italian entertainment television channel, launched on May 12, 2010, operated by the media company Mediaset and owned by MFE - MediaForEurope. It is broadcast in Italy on DTT channel 30 on mux Mediaset 4  and digital satellite television through Tivù Sat.

It is dedicated to a female audiences and broadcast movies, television series and soap operas.

Programming

TV series
 Acacias 38
Baciati dall'amore
The Bold and the Beautiful
Beautiful People
Buffy the Vampire Slayer
 Californication
 Cashmere Mafia
Caterina e le sue figlie
Erkenci Kuş
Emilie Richards
 Friends
Gilmore Girls
 Hope & Faith
House
 Jack & Bobby
Inga Lindström
L'onore e il rispetto
Le tre rose di Eva
 Patito Feo
 Privileged
 Pushing Daisies
Riverdale
Royal Pains
 Rules of Engagement
El secreto de Puente Viejo
Storm of Love
The O.C.
The Originals
The Vampire Diaries
 The Tudors
Una nuova vita
Un Paso Adelante
 Veronica Mars
Vivere
 Wildfire
 Will & Grace

Entertainment programs
 Amici di Maria De Filippi
 Grande Fratello
 Pomeriggio Cinque
 La Pupa e il Secchione
 Verissimo

References

External links
 Official website 

Mediaset television channels
Television channels and stations established in 2010
2010 establishments in Italy
Italian-language television stations
Women's interest channels